Aurel Vlaicu was an aviation pioneer.
 Aurel Vlaicu International Airport in Bucharest is named in his honor.

Aurel Vlaicu may also refer to several places in Romania, all named after him:

Aurel Vlaicu, a village in Avrămeni commune, Botoşani County
Aurel Vlaicu, a district in the town of Geoagiu, Hunedoara County
Aurel Vlaicu, a district in the town of Sighișoara, Mureș County by the Pârâul Câinelui (Târnava Mare) river